HMS Shikari (D85) was an Admiralty S-class destroyer of the Royal Navy. She was built by William Doxford & Sons, Sunderland and launched on 14 July 1919. She was one of the destroyers that took part in the Invergordon Mutiny. In 1933, she was briefly commanded by Frederic John Walker, who was to rise to fame as the foremost Allied submarine hunter of World War II.

On 4 June 1940, Shikari was the last ship to leave Dunkirk.

Construction and design
Shikari was ordered from Doxford Shipyard in April 1917 as part of the first batch of 24 S-class destroyers. The S class were intended as a fast  destroyer for service that would be cheaper than the large V-class destroyers that preceded them and so able to be ordered in large numbers. They displaced  standard and  full load. The design gun armament of the S class was three  guns and a single 2-pounder (40 mm) "pom-pom" anti-aircraft gun. Torpedo armament was four  torpedo tubes in two twin rotating mounts and two  tubes.

Shikari was laid down on 15 January 1918, but construction was slowed by the end of the First World War in November 1918, and she was not launched until 14 July 1919. After launching, Shikari was towed to Chatham Dockyard for fitting out. It was decided to use Shikari as a control ship for the old battleship and target ship . As a control ship, Shikari was unarmed, with a large deckhouse for the radio-control equipment fitted between the ship's funnels. She was finally commissioned in February 1924.

Early in the Second World War, Shikari, along with several other S-class destroyers based in the UK, was modified as a dedicated anti-submarine escort. After conversion, armament consisted of a single 4-inch gun forward, with a 12-pounder anti-aircraft gun amidships. Close-in anti-aircraft armament consisted of two quadruple Vickers .50 machine gun mounts. Both sets of torpedo-tubes were removed, allowing a heavy depth charge armament, with 112 depth charges carried, with sufficient depth charge throwers and racks to allow 14-charge patterns of charges to be used. Type 286 radar and Type 133 Sonar was fitted. Later in the war, the depth charge armament was reduced, with a 10-charge pattern substituted (as this was found to be as effective as the earlier 14-charge pattern). The .50 machine guns were eventually replaced by four single Oerlikon 20 mm cannon, and the 12 pounder anti-aircraft gun removed to allow Type 271 radar to be fitted on a lattice mast aft.

Service

Shikari was present at Invergordon in September 1931 during the Invergordon Mutiny, although there was little trouble on board. Amongst Shikaris commanding officers during the inter-war period was Commander Frederic John Walker, who became a notable anti-submarine warfare commander during the Second World War.

On the outbreak of the Second World War, Shikari was re-armed and from January 1940 carried out convoy escort operations. At the end of May 1940, the British Expeditionary Force (BEF) was trapped by German forces at Dunkirk, and it was decided to launch Operation Dynamo, the evacuation of the BEF from Dunkirk, and Shikari was one of the destroyers that took part in the operation, carrying out her first evacuation trip on 28 May, making a second trip on 29 May. On 29 May, Admiral of the Fleet Dudley Pound, First Sea Lord, ordered the withdrawal of modern destroyers from the Dunkirk operations owing to the high losses, putting greater pressure on old destroyers such as Shikari. On 1 June, the steamer  was badly damaged by near misses from German artillery and bombing. Shikari, along with the sloop  and the paddle minesweeper Queen of Thanet, took off Pragues load of 3,000 French troops before Prague beached herself on the Sandwich Flats. Shikari herself was damaged by German bombing on 1 June. Shikari continued to make evacuation runs and at 03:40 on the night of 3/4 June 1940 was the last ship to leave Dunkirk. In total, Shikari made seven trips to Dunkirk during Operation Dynamo, embarking 3349 troops.

On 24 July, the French troopship , repatriating French sailors after the French armistice with Germany, was torpedoed by the German Schnellboot S.27, and Shikari, together with the destroyers ,  and  rescued the survivors.

On 9 September 1940, Convoy HX 72 left Halifax, Nova Scotia, bound for the UK. The convoy was escorted most of the way across the Atlantic by the armed merchant cruiser , with an escort of destroyers and corvettes (including Shikari) to protect the convoy for the dangerous final stages through the Western Approaches. Jervis Bay left the convoy on 20 September, before the escort group had rendezvoused with the convoy. The German submarine  spotted the unescorted convoy shortly after Jervis Bay had left, and shadowed the convoy allowing a "wolfpack" of U-boats to be assembled against the convoy. Shikari was tasked with rescuing the crews from the torpedoed merchant ships, while the remaining four escorts stayed with the convoy.

Shikari continued in the convoy escort role in the Western Approaches area, serving with the 2nd Escort Group based at Londonderry in Northern Ireland, and along with sister ship  attacked a suspected submarine on 22 December 1940 when escorting Convoy OB 262. On 24 October 1941, Shikari sustained serious damage in high seas south of Iceland, losing a funnel, and was under repair at Belfast until December that year, joining the 21st Escort Group, based at Iceland. Shikari continued in the convoy escort role into 1944, entering reserve and being used for training from September 1944.

Shikari was sold for scrap in September 1945, arriving at Cashmore's shipbreaking yard on 4 November 1945.

Notes

References
 
 
 
 
 
 
 
  
 
  
 
 
 

 

S-class destroyers (1917) of the Royal Navy
1919 ships
World War I destroyers of the United Kingdom
Ships built on the River Wear